Czech Republic–United Kingdom relations are foreign relations between the Czech Republic and the United Kingdom. The Czech Republic has an embassy in London and four honorary consulates (in Cardiff, Edinburgh, Manchester and Newtownards).  The United Kingdom has an embassy in Prague.

Both states are members of NATO.

History

The United Kingdom and Czechoslovakia historically had lukewarm, although not hostile, relations largely due to Britain's lack of involvement in continental Europe beyond France and Czechoslovakia being caught in between the mostly capitalist Allied countries and the Soviet Union. Initially the two nations were allies and trading partners during the years prior to World War II. The first Czechoslovak Republic's founder Tomáš Masaryk had lived in London during World War I, where he had met Wickham Steed, a famous Times Journalist and Sir George Clerk. Ex British intelligence officer Robert Bruce was a notable English Czechophile, who later go on to become commercial secretary and was on friendly terms with Masaryk, the first president of Czechoslovakia. Ties were somewhat strained when Nazi Germany annexed much of the country under the terms of the Munich Agreement (1938), which many Czechs viewed as the "Munich betrayal". Over 500 Czech pilots, most of whom had fled the Nazi occupation to Allied countries, served with Royal Air Force and gained distinction during the Battle of Britain for their bravery and skills. One such pilot was Josef František, a Distinguished Flying Medal recipient and one of only two non-Commonwealth nationals among "The Few" who were the top ten leading aces. Britain was one of several countries Czech Jewish refugees fled to, most notably through Kindertransport.

During the Cold War, relations again worsened as Britain was an ally of the United States, the "enemy" of the Soviet Union, making Britain and the Socialist-ruled Czechoslovakia "enemies" by association. Since the dissolution of Czechoslovakia, economic relations have largely normalised, although neither countries are priority allies for the other.

Trade
Bilateral trade was worth £6.7 billion in 2011.

Migration

The 2001 UK Census recorded 12,220 Czech-born people resident in the UK. With the accession of the Czech Republic to the European Union in May 2004, Czechs gained the right to live and work elsewhere in the EU, and substantial numbers moved to the UK for work, although there has been substantial return migration. The Office for National Statistics estimates that, as of October 2010 to September 2011, 24,000 to 40,000 Czech-born people were living in the UK.

State visits

Queen Elizabeth II paid a state visit to the Czech Republic in March 1996, she visited Prague and Brno and was received by President Václav Havel.

See also 

Foreign relations of the Czech Republic
Foreign relations of the United Kingdom
Czech migration to the United Kingdom
British diaspora

Notes and references

External links 
 Czech embassy in London
 British Foreign and Commonwealth Office about the relation with Hungary
 British embassy in Prague
British Chamber of Commerce (Prague)
British Czech and Slovak Association

 
United Kingdom
Bilateral relations of the United Kingdom